"Destination Unknown" is a song  by American band Missing Persons. It was written by Dale Bozzio, Terry Bozzio, and Warren Cuccurullo with production by Ken Scott at Frank Zappa's Utility Muffin Research Kitchen studio. Originally released on the band's self-titled EP (1980), the song was released as a single in September 1982 and appeared on their debut studio album Spring Session M (1982).

In the United States, it was a minor hit spending 13 weeks on the Billboard Hot 100 chart, narrowly missing the Top 40 by peaking at #42 in November 1982.

Release history

Charts

Cover versions and media appearances
The Smashing Pumpkins have covered this song; it appears on their 1996 box set The Aeroplane Flies High.
Replicants recorded a cover of this song for their 1995 self-titled album.
Erectus Monotone covered the song on the 1992 compilation album "Tannis Root Presents: Freedom of Choice".
Joan Jett and the Blackhearts covered the song for the soundtrack of the 2009 movie Endless Bummer.
The song is featured in the 2006 video game Grand Theft Auto: Vice City Stories on the in-game radio station Flash FM.
The song is played at the end of Season 2, episode 7, titled "Nothing Shattered," of the Netflix series GLOW.
The song is played during The Goldbergs Season 8 Episode 20 episode Poker Night.
The song is played in Episode 6, Season 2 of the Netflix series, Sex Education during Otis’ party.

References

External links

 

1982 singles
Song recordings produced by Ken Scott
Songs written by Warren Cuccurullo
1980 songs
Capitol Records singles
Missing Persons (band) songs